Nathan Gordon may refer to:

 Nathan Green Gordon (1916–2008), American lawyer, politician, and naval aviator
 Nathan Gordon (footballer) (born 1990), Australian rules footballer
 Nathan H. Gordon (1872–1938), motion picture executive